Sphaeriida is an order of bivalves belonging to the class Bivalvia.

Families:
 Neomiodontidae
 Sphaeriidae

References

Bivalves
Bivalve orders